Nevis is a city in Hubbard County, Minnesota, United States. The population was 377 at the 2020 census.

Minnesota State Highway 34 serves as a main arterial route in the community.

Nevis began as a railway village. A post office was established in 1899, and the village separated from Nevis Township and incorporated in 1921.

The Louis J. Moser House near Nevis was constructed in the early 1900s and used as a fishing camp.  It is listed on the National Register of Historic Places.

Robert G. Renner, a U.S. federal judge, was born in Nevis in 1923.

The muskie fish is native to the waterways in the area, and is celebrated in Nevis.  Nevis Muskie Days are held each July, and include a 5K run, a street dance, and numerous vendors. The city is also home to the Nevis Tiger Muskie, a 30-foot-long sculpture.

Nevis is located along the Heartland State Trail, a multi-use recreational rail trail.

Geography

Demographics

2010 census
As of the census of 2010, there were 390 people, 173 households, and 102 families residing in the city. The racial makeup of the city was 95.6% White, 0.3% African American, 1.0% Native American, and 3.1% from two or more races. Hispanic or Latino of any race were 0.5% of the population.

There were 173 households, of which 26.0% had children under the age of 18 living with them, 43.9% were married couples living together, 10.4% had a female householder with no husband present, 4.6% had a male householder with no wife present, and 41.0% were non-families. 34.7% of all households were made up of individuals, and 21.4% had someone living alone who was 65 years of age or older. The average household size was 2.23 and the average family size was 2.81.

The median age in the city was 45.5 years. 24.6% of residents were under the age of 18; 4.9% were between the ages of 18 and 24; 20.2% were from 25 to 44; 26.6% were from 45 to 64; and 23.6% were 65 years of age or older. The gender makeup of the city was 48.7% male and 51.3% female.

2000 census
As of the census of 2000, there were 364 people, 162 households, and 109 families residing in the city. The racial makeup of the city was 96.98% White, 1.10% Native American, 0.27% from other races, and 1.65% from two or more races. Hispanic or Latino of any race were 1.65% of the population.

There were 162 households, out of which 26.5% had children under the age of 18 living with them, 56.2% were married couples living together, 9.3% had a female householder with no husband present, and 32.1% were non-families. 29.6% of all households were made up of individuals, and 18.5% had someone living alone who was 65 years of age or older.  The average household size was 2.25 and the average family size was 2.74.

In the city, the population was spread out, with 23.6% under the age of 18, 4.1% from 18 to 24, 24.2% from 25 to 44, 22.8% from 45 to 64, and 25.3% who were 65 years of age or older.  The median age was 43 years. For every 100 females, there were 81.1 males.  For every 100 females age 18 and over, there were 82.9 males.

The median income for a household in the city was $26,771, and the median income for a family was $35,938. Males had a median income of $27,188 versus $20,000 for females. The per capita income for the city was $14,259.  About 11.7% of families and 14.0% of the population were below the poverty line, including 12.0% of those under age 18 and 15.2% of those age 65 or over.

Radio stations
FM radio
92.5 KXKK 92.5 Hot Country
94.5 KDLB Adult Contemporary The Arrow 94.7
97.5  KDKK 97.5 Music of Your Life
99.1  KLLZ-FM 99.1 Z99 Classic Rock
101.9 KQKK KQ102
102.5 KKWB-FM

AM radio
820  WBKK
870  KPRM Classic Country News/Talk
1070 KSKK Country, 10,000 Watts
1570 KAKK Oldies 1570, 10,000 Watts

References

External links
 City of Nevis
 Nevis Civic and Commerce
 Nevis Public School

Cities in Minnesota
Cities in Hubbard County, Minnesota
1899 establishments in Minnesota